Vito Žuraj (born 7 May 1979) is a Slovenian composer whose works are played internationally.

Career 
Born in Maribor, he obtained a degree in composition and music theory with Marko Mihevc at the Ljubljana Academy of Music. He then moved to Dresden to further his education at the Hochschule für Musik Carl Maria von Weber with Lothar Voigtländer, and moved to study with Wolfgang Rihm at the Hochschule für Musik Karlsruhe, where he completed a master's degree in computer music, supervised by Thomas A. Troge.

Žuraj writes chamber, vocal and symphonic music. He has composed for Boštjan Lipovšek, among others. Several of his symphonic works have been performed by the Maribor Philharmonic, the RTV Slovenia Symphony Orchestra, and the Slovenian Philharmonic Orchestra, with Simon Robinson, Lior Shambadal and Marko Letonja conducting. Festivals included the Salzburg Festival, the Ultraschall festival in Berlin, the Darmstädter Ferienkurse and the Wittener Tage für neue Kammermusik, the Gaudeamus Muziekweek and the Takefu International Music Festival in Japan.

Awards 
 2017 Claudio Abbado Composition Prize of the Orchester-Akademie of the Berlin Philharmonic

Discography 
 Maxply (2010)
 Crosscourt (2008)
 Chamber Music (2003)
 Composer's presentation – Vito Žuraj (2001)

References

External links 
 
 
 

Slovenian composers
Male composers
1979 births
Living people
University of Ljubljana alumni
Musicians from Ljubljana
Slovenian male musicians